The  Chicago Rush season was the 12th season for the franchise in the Arena Football League. The team was coached by Bob McMillen and played their last few home games at BMO Harris Bank Center. The team's first five home games were played at Allstate Arena. The Rush won their division with a 10–8 record, but fell in the conference semifinals by a 69–47 score to the Spokane Shock.

Ownership
On November 12, 2012, the Chicago Rush were purchased by a group, headed by Julee White of Testarossa Entertainment, but the purchase was terminated by the AFL three months later due to the ownership's failure to meet league obligations.

On February 7, 2013, the Rush were purchased by Star Rush Football, LLC, an ownership led by private-equity firm manager David Staral Jr.  Weeks later, they finalized a deal with Allstate Arena in Rosemont to play all but two home games. The other two home games (June 8 against the Utah Blaze and June 15 versus the San Antonio Talons) will be played at the BMO Harris Bank Center in Rockford, Illinois, which hosted the first "test game" for the AFL in 1986. One week before the season opener, the new ownership group introduced the team's new logo and uniforms, which removed the gray from the logo and replaced it with red. It was reported on May 7, 2013 that Staral Jr. had been ordered by the league to leave the team for not paying league dues, causing the league to take ownership of the Rush yet again.

It was announced on May 24 that the Rush would not play either of its final two home games at Allstate Arena. The league announced on May 30 that the game scheduled for July 13 against the Cleveland Gladiators would be played at BMO Harris Bank Center, while the team's final regular season game against the San Jose SaberCats was changed to a road game to be played at HP Pavilion at San Jose, the home of the SaberCats.

Standings

Regular season schedule
The Rush began the season by hosting the Iowa Barnstormers on March 23. They closed the regular season against the San Jose SaberCats on the road on July 27.

Playoffs

Final roster

Staff

References

Chicago Rush
Chicago Rush seasons
Chicago